AURO University, formerly AURO University of Hospitality and Management, is a private university located at Surat, Gujarat, India. It was established in 2011 by the Rama family through The Gujarat Private Universities (Amendment) Act, 2011. Dr Parimal Vyas is the VC of the university

References

External links 

Private universities in India
Hospitality schools in India
Universities in Gujarat
Education in Surat
Educational institutions established in 2011
2011 establishments in Gujarat